Winstanley may refer to:

People:
Alan Winstanley, British record producer
Bill Winstanley, English footballer who played for Stoke City
Dean Winstanley, English darts player
Eric Winstanley, English footballer
Gerrard Winstanley, 17th-century English religious reformer
Henry Winstanley, 17th-century English engineer
Ivan Winstanley, South African football player
Michael Winstanley, Baron Winstanley, late 20th-century English politician and Member of Parliament
Neil Winstanley, South African football player
Paul Winstanley, British painter
Russ Winstanley, British disc jockey
William Winstanley (c. 1628 – 1698), English poet and compiler of biographies.

Other:
Winstanley, Greater Manchester, England
Winstanley (ward), an electoral ward of the Wigan Metropolitan Borough Council
Billinge and Winstanley Urban District 
Winstanley College, Sixth Form College
Winstanley (film), 1975 film about Gerrard Winstanley